Dalsbygda is a village in Os Municipality in Innlandet county, Norway. There are about 600 people who live in the village. The area is characterized by agriculture, particularly with dairy production.

Dalsbygda Church is located in the village.

Notable residents
Annar Ryen
Therese Johaug 
Arnljot Nyaas

References

External links

Os, Innlandet
Villages in Innlandet